In Greek mythology, Metope  may refer to the following individuals:

 Metope, a river-nymph, the daughter of the river Ladon and Stymphalis, thus sister to Daphne. Her waters were near the town of Stymphalus in the Peloponnesus. She married the river god Asopus by whom she had several (either 12 or 20) daughters, including Aegina, Salamis, Thebe, Corcyra, Tanagra, Thespia, Cleone, Sinope, Peirene, Asopis, Ornea, Chalcis, Harpina and Ismene; and sons, including Pelagon (Pelasgus) and Ismenus. The question of the exact parentage of these children of Asopus is very vague.
 Metope, a daughter of the above Asopus in some accounts.
 Metope, consort of the river god Sangarius. Some say these were the possible parents of Hecuba. She may be identical or different from the above Metope.
 Metope, an Epirotian princess as the daughter of King Echetus. She had an intrigue with a lover and as a punishment her father mutilated the lover and blinded Metope by piercing her eyes with bronze needles. He then incarcerated her in a tower and gave her grains of bronze, promising that she would regain her sight when she had ground these grains into flour. Eustathius and the scholia on this passage call the daughter and her lover Amphissa and Aechmodicus respectively.

Notes

References 
 Apollodorus, The Library with an English Translation by Sir James George Frazer, F.B.A., F.R.S. in 2 Volumes, Cambridge, MA, Harvard University Press; London, William Heinemann Ltd. 1921. . Online version at the Perseus Digital Library. Greek text available from the same website.
Apollonius Rhodius, Argonautica translated by Robert Cooper Seaton (1853-1915), R. C. Loeb Classical Library Volume 001. London, William Heinemann Ltd, 1912. Online version at the Topos Text Project.
Apollonius Rhodius, Argonautica. George W. Mooney. London. Longmans, Green. 1912. Greek text available at the Perseus Digital Library.
Diodorus Siculus, The Library of History translated by Charles Henry Oldfather. Twelve volumes. Loeb Classical Library. Cambridge, Massachusetts: Harvard University Press; London: William Heinemann, Ltd. 1989. Vol. 3. Books 4.59–8. Online version at Bill Thayer's Web Site
Diodorus Siculus, Bibliotheca Historica. Vol 1-2. Immanel Bekker. Ludwig Dindorf. Friedrich Vogel. in aedibus B. G. Teubneri. Leipzig. 1888-1890. Greek text available at the Perseus Digital Library.
Homer, The Odyssey with an English Translation by A.T. Murray, PH.D. in two volumes. Cambridge, MA., Harvard University Press; London, William Heinemann, Ltd. 1919. . Online version at the Perseus Digital Library. Greek text available from the same website.
Pindar, Odes translated by Diane Arnson Svarlien. 1990. Online version at the Perseus Digital Library.
Pindar, The Odes of Pindar including the Principal Fragments with an Introduction and an English Translation by Sir John Sandys, Litt.D., FBA. Cambridge, MA., Harvard University Press; London, William Heinemann Ltd. 1937. Greek text available at the Perseus Digital Library.

Naiads
Nymphs
Children of Potamoi
Mythological blind people